NGTS-13b is an exoplanet that was discovered by NGTS. It takes 4.12 days to orbit its host star and its discovery was announced in January 2021.

Discovery
The planet was discovered by the Next Generation Transit Survey, and the paper states that exoplanets are usually not found around giants and subgiants due to the host engulfing the planet.

Properties
NGTS-13b has 4 times more mass than Jupiter, but maintains a radius similar to the Jovian planet. The planet has a typical 4 day orbit of a Hot Jupiter, and has an average temperature of 1,605 K, but has a hotter dayside temperature of 1,828 K.

References 

Hot Jupiters
Centaurus (constellation)
Exoplanets discovered in 2021